Paul Joseph Chartier (August 5, 1921 – May 18, 1966) was a Canadian man who died when a bomb he was preparing exploded in a washroom of the Parliament of Canada. It is believed that he was preparing to bomb the House of Commons.

Early life
Born in rural Alberta to parents who owned a small hotel, Chartier became a trucker at age 20. However, in 1960, he ran into financial trouble and was forced to declare bankruptcy and sell his truck. He was also investigated for fraud and his marriage failed. Moving to Toronto, he settled in a rooming house on Major Street.

Bomb plot
Before the attempted attack, Chartier had purchased ten sticks of dynamite in Newmarket, Ontario. After assembling a bomb, he travelled to Ottawa and entered the gallery of the House of Commons. At the time, visitors to Parliament were not searched. He watched the proceedings for a time, and then departed for a nearby washroom. There he lit the fuse of his dynamite-based bomb, likely intending to return to the gallery and throw it upon the Members of Parliament below. However, the bomb exploded as Chartier exited the washroom. He was carrying it in his right hand, and it blew off his arm and tore open his torso, killing him instantly, but harming no one else. The washroom was heavily damaged, but the thick wooden door contained the blast in that room. No other part of the Centre Block itself was seriously damaged.

After his death, police found a number of writings and letters earlier sent to newspapers were uncovered. He stated that because of government actions, no one could afford to live and that politicians were rich and greedy. He attacked politicians and homosexuals in his writings. He wrote that his plan was to "exterminate as many members as possible," and that he was prepared to die in the process. He declared his desire to become "President [sic] of Canada", and stated that he would appoint Toronto alderman June Marks as his Vice President. When police raided his apartment, they found several other sticks of dynamite.

See also 
Denis Lortie, 1984 shooter who attacked the Quebec parliament National Assembly building and chamber
Michael Zehaf-Bibeau, 2014 shooter who attacked the Canadian Parliament Buildings Centre Block
List of attacks on legislatures

References

"Chartier Wanted Presidency with June Marks as his Deputy." The Globe and Mail May 21, 1966, pg. 10
"MPs Say Explosion Premature, Man's Bomb Meant for Chamber."  The Globe and Mail May 19, 1966, pg. 10

Further reading
 CBC News. Bomb in Parliament misses its target in 1966
James Fontana. The Mad Bomber of Parliament Hill

Terrorism in Canada
1966 in Canada
1921 births
1966 deaths
Bombers (people)
People from Alberta
Crime in Ontario
Attacks on legislatures
Failed terrorist attempts in Canada
Place of birth missing
Terrorist incidents in Canada in the 1960s
1966 crimes in Canada